Bernard Gariépy Strobl is a Canadian re-recording sound mixer, best known internationally as the supervising re-recording mixer of Arrival (2016), for which he won the BAFTA Award for Best Sound (shared with Claude La Haye and Sylvain Bellemare) and was nominated for the Academy Award for Best Sound Mixing (shared with La Haye). He has been a re-recording mixer on many prominent Quebec films of the last two decades, including The Red Violin (1998), C.R.A.Z.Y. (2005), Monsieur Lazhar (2011), War Witch (2012), Gabrielle (2013), and Endorphine (2015).

His father, Hans Peter Strobl, was also a rerecording mixer in film.

Awards

Academy Awards
The Academy Awards are a set of awards given by the Academy of Motion Picture Arts and Sciences annually for excellence of cinematic achievements.

British Academy Film Awards
The British Academy Film Award is an annual award show presented by the British Academy of Film and Television Arts.

Genie Awards and Canadian Screen Awards
The Canadian Screen Awards (French: Les prix Écrans canadiens) are awards given annually by the Academy of Canadian Cinema & Television recognizing excellence in Canadian film, English-language television, and digital media productions. Before 2013, the Academy awarded the Genie Awards.

Jutra Awards and Prix Iris
Quebec's film awards were formerly known as the Jutra Awards; the Prix Iris name was announced in October 2016.

References

External links
 
 Interview at Goldderby.com

Living people
Best Sound BAFTA Award winners
Best Sound Genie and Canadian Screen Award winners
Canadian audio engineers
Year of birth missing (living people)